The 2017 Stockton ATP Challenger was a professional tennis tournament played on hard courts. It was the second edition of the tournament which was part of the 2017 ATP Challenger Tour. It took place in Stockton, California, United States between 2 October and 8 October 2017.

Singles main-draw entrants

Seeds

 1 Rankings are as of September 25, 2017.

Other entrants
The following players received wildcards into the singles main draw:
  Deiton Baughman
  Akram El Sallaly
  André Göransson
  Denis Kudla

The following players received entry into the singles main draw using protected rankings:
  Frank Dancevic
  Alexander Ward

The following player received entry into the singles main draw as an alternate:
  Stefan Kozlov

The following players received entry from the qualifying draw:
  Sekou Bangoura
  Jan Choinski
  Frederik Nielsen
  Dmitry Tursunov

Champions

Singles

 Cameron Norrie def.  Darian King 6–1, 6–3.

Doubles

 Brydan Klein /  Joe Salisbury def.  Denis Kudla /  Miķelis Lībietis 6–2, 6–4.

References

2017 ATP Challenger Tour
Tennis tournaments in California
Sports competitions in Stockton, California
2017 in sports in California